China Adolescents Science & Technology Innovation Contest (CASTIC) is one of the biggest national science competitions in China held by organizations including China Association for Science and Technology and Ministry of Education of the People's Republic of China. Every year, more than 10 million students from all parts of China submit their projects in local-level competitions and up to 500 projects are eventually selected for the CASTIC. A few top projects are further selected to participate in competitions including Broadcom Masters International, Intel International Science and Engineering Fair, or European Union Contest for Young Scientists.

Location

Before 2002 

China Adolescents Innovation Contest and Science Seminar
 1st (1982): Shanghai
 2nd (1984): Kunming, Yunnan
 3rd (1986): Lanzhou, Gansu
 4th (1988): Beijing
 5th (1990): Chengdu, Sichuan
 6th (1992): Shenyang, Liaoning
 7th (1994): Nanning, Guangxi
 8th (1996): Tianjin
 9th (1998): Hong Kong
 10th (2000): Hefei, Anhui

China Adolescents Biology and Environmental Science Practice Project
 1st (1991): Beijing
 2nd (1993): Shanghai
 3rd (1995): Changsha, Hunan
 4th (1997): Xining, Qinghai
 5th (1999): Hohhot, Inner Mongolia
 6th (2001): Fuzhou, Fujian

After 2002 

In 2002, the biennial China Adolescents Innovation Contest and Science Seminar and the biennial China Adolescents Biology and Environmental Science Practice Project were combined into CASTIC.

 17th (2002): Zhengzhou, Henan
 18th (2003): Lanzhou, Gansu
 19th (2004): Chengdu, Sichuan
 20th (2005): Beijing
 21st (2006): Macau
 22nd (2007): Kunming, Yunnan
 23rd (2008): Ürümqi, Xinjiang
 24th (2009): Jinan, Shandong
 25th (2010): Guangzhou, Guangdong
 26th (2011): Hohhot, Inner Mongolia
 27th (2012): Yinchuan, Ningxia
 28th (2013): Nanjing, Jiangsu
 29th (2014): Beijing
 30th (2015): Hong Kong
 31st (2016): Shanghai
 32nd (2017): Hangzhou, Zhejiang
 33rd (2018): Chongqing
 34th (2019): Macau

References

External links 

  

Annual fairs
Science competitions
Youth science
Fairs in China
Science events in China